Ciprian Gheorghe Gliga (born 17 April 1997) is a Romanian professional footballer who plays as a midfielder. In his career, Gliga also played for teams such as: Avântul Reghin, Dunărea Călărași or Concordia Chiajna.

References

External links
 
 

1997 births
Living people
People from Reghin
Romanian footballers
Association football midfielders
Liga I players
Liga II players
Liga III players
CSM Avântul Reghin players
LPS HD Clinceni players
FC Dunărea Călărași players
CS Concordia Chiajna players